Khalid  Lebhij ( – born 27 December 1985, Oujda) is a Moroccan footballer who plays as a midfielder.

Honors

Club
Wydad Casablanca
Moroccan League: 2009-10

References

External links
 
 

1985 births
Living people
Moroccan footballers
Moroccan expatriate footballers
People from Oujda
Association football midfielders
Morocco international footballers